Breyne is a surname. Notable people with the surname include:

Jacob Breyne (1637–1697), German merchant and botanist
Johann Philipp Breyne (1680–1764), German botanist, palaeontologist, zoologist and entomologist
Jonathan Breyne (born 1991), Belgian cyclist
Paul Breyne (born 1947), Belgian politician

Surnames
Surnames of Belgian origin
Surnames of German origin